Kardib is a rural locality (a selo) and the administrative center of Kardibsky Selsoviet, Tlyaratinsky District, Republic of Dagestan, Russia. The population was 389 as of 2010. There are 2 streets.

Geography 
Kardib is located 21 km east of Tlyarata (the district's administrative centre) by road. Gindib is the nearest rural locality.

References 

Rural localities in Tlyaratinsky District